The 2014 La Flèche Wallonne Féminine was a women's bicycle race in Belgium.

Results

World Cup standings
Standings after 4 of 9 2014 UCI Women's Road World Cup races.

Individuals

Team: Boels–Dolmans Cycling Team
Mountain: 
Sprint: Iris Slappendel
Youth: Pauline Ferrand-Prévot

References

2014 UCI Women's Road World Cup
2014
2014 in Belgian sport